The 2016 CS Warsaw Cup was a senior international figure skating competition, held in November 2016 in Warsaw, Poland. It was part of the 2016–17 ISU Challenger Series. Medals were awarded in the disciplines of men's singles, ladies' singles, pair skating, and ice dancing.

Entries 
The International Skating Union published the full preliminary list of entries on 30 October 2016.

 Withdrew before starting orders drawn
 Men: Deniss Vasiļjevs (LAT)
 Ladies: Hristina Vassileva (BUL), Angelīna Kučvaļska (LAT)

Results

Men

Ladies

Pairs

Ice dancing

References

External links
 2016 CS Warsaw Cup at the International Skating Union
 Results page

Warsaw Cup
CS Warsaw Cup
2016 in Polish sport